
The following is a list of recurring Saturday Night Live sketches, organized alphabetically by title. The referenced date is the date when the sketch first appeared.

For a chronological list, see Recurring Saturday Night Live characters and sketches.

A

B

C

D

E
 E. Buzz Miller and Christie Christina (Dan Aykroyd, Laraine Newman) – January 22, 1977
 Ed Grimley (Martin Short) – October 6, 1984
 El Dorko (Gary Kroeger) – January 28, 1984
 The Elevator Fans (Dana Carvey, Kevin Nealon) – January 19, 1991
 Emily Litella (Gilda Radner) – November 15, 1975
 The Essentials with Robert Osborne (Bill Hader) – November 20, 2010
 The Ex-Police (Dan Aykroyd, Bill Murray) – October 15, 1977

F
 The Falconer (Will Forte) – November 9, 2002
 Father Guido Sarducci (Don Novello) – May 13, 1978
 The Ferey Muhtar Talk Show (Horatio Sanz) – March 16, 2002
 Fericito (Fred Armisen) – October 5, 2002
 Fernando's Hideaway (Billy Crystal) – November 3, 1984
 The Festrunk Brothers (Wild and Crazy Guys) (Dan Aykroyd, Steve Martin) – September 24, 1977
 Frank & Papa (Tim Kazurinsky, Tony Rosato) – April 11, 1981
 Frank Gannon, P.I. P.I. (Kevin Nealon) – April 13, 1991
 The Franken and Davis Show (Al Franken, Tom Davis) – May 20, 1978
 The Further Adventures of Biff and Salena (Jon Lovitz, Joan Cusack) – February 22, 1986

G

H

I
 I Married A Monkey (Tim Kazurinsky) – April 11, 1981
 I'm Chillin' (Chris Rock, Chris Farley) – January 12, 1991
 Instant Coffee with Bill Smith (Kevin Nealon) – October 18, 1986
 Iris De Flaminio (Jane Curtin) – April 5, 1980
 Irving Cohen (Martin Short) – November 10, 1984
 Issues with Jeffrey Kaufman (Jim Breuer) – October 18, 1997

J

K
 Kaitlin & Rick (Amy Poehler, Horatio Sanz) – May 1, 2004
 Karl's Video (David Spade) – October 9, 1993
 The Keisters (Phil Hartman, Jan Hooks, Victoria Jackson) – December 13, 1986
 The Kelly Brothers (Fred Armisen, Will Forte) – February 8, 2003
 Kevin Franklin (Tim Meadows) – February 10, 1996
 Kickspit Underground Festival (Jason Sudeikis, Nasim Pedrad) – December 5, 2009
 The Killer Bees (John Belushi, Bill Murray, Garrett Morris, Dan Aykroyd and others) – October 11, 1975
 Kincaid (Ana Gasteyer) – September 28, 1996

L

M

N
 Nadeen (Cheri Oteri) – November 13, 1999
 Nadine and Rowena (Denny Dillon, Gail Matthius) – December 13, 1980
 Nathan Thurm (Martin Short) – November 17, 1984
 The Nerds (Lisa Loopner) (Gilda Radner, featuring Bill Murray as Todd, and Jane Curtin as Mrs. Loopner) – January 28, 1978
 Nicholas Fehn (Fred Armisen) – October 13, 2007
 Nick The Lounge Singer (Bill Murray) – April 16, 1977
 Nick Burns, Your Company's Computer Guy (Jimmy Fallon) – November 20, 1999
 Nicole, The Girl With No Gaydar (Rachel Dratch) – November 3, 2001
 Noony and Nuni Schoener, Art Dealers (Fred Armisen, Maya Rudolph, Chris Parnell) – January 15, 2005

O
 Olympia Cafe (Cheeseburger, Cheeseburger) (John Belushi, Dan Aykroyd, Laraine Newman, Bill Murray) – January 28, 1978
 Opera Man (Adam Sandler) – April 18, 1992
 Orgasm Guy (Rob Schneider) – December 12, 1992
 The Original Kings of Catchphrase Comedy – March 12, 2011
 Out Of Africa ("You put your weed in there!") (Rob Schneider) – September 25, 1993

P

Q
 Queen Shenequa (Ellen Cleghorne) – October 26, 1991
 The Quiet Storm (Tim Meadows) – October 19, 1996

R

S

T

U
 Uncle Roy (Buck Henry) – November 11, 1978
 Unfrozen Caveman Lawyer (Phil Hartman) – November 23, 1991
 Uri (Sabra) (Tom Hanks) – December 8, 1990

V
 Velvet Jones (Eddie Murphy) – October 17, 1981
 Veronica & Co. (Molly Shannon, Chris Parnell) – December 9, 2000
 Vic Salukin (Tony Rosato) – October 31, 1981
 Vickie & Debbie (Gail Matthius, Denny Dillon) – November 15, 1980
 Vincent Price's Holiday Special (Bill Hader) – November 19, 2005
 Vinnie Barber (Jon Lovitz) – January 18, 1986
 Visiting the Queen (Fred Armisen, Bill Hader) – November 20, 2010
 The Vogelchecks (Fred Armisen, Kristen Wiig, Andy Samberg) – November 15, 2008
 Voice Recording Date (Rachel Dratch) – October 8, 2005

W

X
 The X-Presidents (a cartoon by Robert Smigel) – January 11, 1997

Z
 Z105 with Joey Mack (Jimmy Fallon) – November 2, 2002
 Zagat's (Chris Farley, Adam Sandler) – February 25, 1995
 The Zimmermans (Chris Kattan, Cheri Oteri) – February 15, 1997
 Zoraida the NBC Page (Ellen Cleghorne) – September 28, 1991

Lists of recurring Saturday Night Live characters and sketches

ru:Ник Бернс